OGM Ormanspor is a Turkish professional basketball club based in Ankara. Currently, the team plays in the Turkish Basketball First League. Established in 1971, the team played in the lower divisions of Turkish basketball for decades. In 2019, Ormanspor was promoted to the BSL for the first time in club history.

The basketball team is part of the multi-sports club OGM Ormanspor.

History
The club was established in 1971. In the 2016–17 season, Ormanspor won the third tier TB2L and was promoted to the second tier TBL. The following season, Ormanspor finished eleventh in the standings. On 14 June 2019, Ormanspor was promoted to the first tier Basketbol Süper Ligi as winners of the TBL play-offs. It was the first time the team would play in the highest tier of Turkish basketball. The team beat İTÜ in the play-off finals, 3–2.

Honours
Turkish Basketball Second League
Champions (1): 2016–17

Players

Current roster

Depth chart

Notable players

Tu Holloway (born 1989), American basketball player for Maccabi Rishon LeZion in the Israeli Basketball Premier League.

References

External links
Official website (in Turkish)
Team profile at Eurobasket.com

Basketball teams in Turkey
Basketball teams established in 1971
Sports teams in Ankara